Willaston railway station was located on the eastern side of Wistaston Road, in Willaston, Cheshire East, England. The station was opened by the London and North Western Railway in 1858, and closed to passengers in December 1954.

A proposal has been put forward to reopen the station.

References

Sources

Further reading

Disused railway stations in Cheshire
Railway stations in Great Britain opened in 1858
Railway stations in Great Britain closed in 1954
Former London and North Western Railway stations